Kyle James Schepel (born August 7, 1990) is an American professional baseball pitcher who is a free agent.

Schepel was born in Grand Rapids, Michigan. He attended Grand Rapids Christian High School and then Grand Valley State University. During his freshman campaign at GVSU, he went 5–1 with a 2.15 ERA in 11 games. In his sophomore year, he was 6–2 with a 5.81 ERA in 15 games. In his junior season, he was 11–0 with a 2.57 ERA in 14 starts. In his senior season, he was 9–4 with a 2.75 ERA in 14 starts, striking out 94 batters in 78.2 innings. He went 31–7 overall and won the Great Lakes Intercollegiate Conference 'Pitcher of the Year Award' in 2011. He is also the university's career leader in victories, games started, strikeouts and innings pitched. He was a pre-season All-American in 2012.

He began his professional career in 2012 in the independent leagues. After going 4–7 with a 3.68 ERA for the Rockford RiverHawks that year, the Arizona Diamondbacks signed him to a contract. He was used as both a starting pitcher and relief pitcher during his two seasons in the Diamondbacks chain. He was 7–8 with a 5.40 ERA in 31 games for the Hillsboro Hops, South Bend Silver Hawks and Visalia Rawhide in 2013. On April 23, he threw a seven-inning no-hitter against the Lansing Lugnuts for his first professional win and on August 31, he tossed a nine-inning no-hitter against the Boise Hawks. He had also flirted with a no-hitter in 2012. He was 4–4 with a 3.84 ERA in 52 relief appearances for the Silver Hawks and Rawhide in 2014. In March 2015, he was released by the Diamondbacks and signed on with the independent Frontier Greys. After a handful of games there, he signed with the Seattle Mariners on June 3. He pitched for the Clinton LumberKings, Bakersfield Blaze and Triple A Tacoma Rainiers that year. He was 1–3 with a 2.93 ERA in 29 games that year. In 2016, he completed his best season to date, tallying a 4–3 record with a 2.09 ERA in 43 appearances, with 75 strikeouts and a .164 batting average against in 43 total appearances between High-A Bakersfield Blaze and Double-A Jackson Generals.

On November 7, 2016, Schepel elected free agency and he signed with the Washington Nationals on December 9, 2016. On January 4, 2017, he was assigned to the Double-A Harrisburg Senators. He elected free agency on November 7, 2017.

On February 28, 2018, Schepel signed with the Sioux Falls Canaries of the American Association. He became a free agent following the season.

References

External links

1990 births
People from Grand Rapids, Michigan
Grand Valley State Lakers baseball players
Rockford RiverHawks players
Hillsboro Hops players
South Bend Silver Hawks players
Visalia Rawhide players
Frontier Greys players
Clinton LumberKings players
Bakersfield Blaze players
Tacoma Rainiers players
Jackson Generals (Southern League) players
Harrisburg Senators players
Potomac Nationals players
Sioux Falls Canaries players
Living people